Events from the year 1779 in Great Britain.

Incumbents
 Monarch – George III
 Prime Minister – Frederick North, Lord North (Tory)
 Parliament – 14th

Events

 9 January – First Anglo-Maratha War: British troops surrender to the Marathas in Wadgaon, India, and are forced to return all territories acquired since 1773.
 11 February – Admiral Keppel acquitted of charges of misconduct brought against him by  Sir Hugh Palliser.
 14 February – Captain James Cook dies on the Sandwich Islands on his third and last voyage.
 23 to 25 February – American Revolutionary War: Battle of Vincennes.
 3 March – American Revolutionary War: Battle of Briar Creek. 
 23 March – astronomer Edward Pigott discovers the Black Eye Galaxy.
 29 March (to 12 May 1780): American Revolutionary War – Siege of Charleston by British forces.
 1 January to 31 March – with a total England and Wales Precipitation of only , this is the driest three consecutive months since records began in 1766.
 12 April – France (at this time in alliance with America) signs a secret treaty with Spain to wage war against Great Britain.
 May – Boulton and Watt's Smethwick Engine, now the oldest working engine in the world, is brought into service.
 3 June – Armada of 1779: Fleet sets sail from France.
 16 June – American Revolutionary War: Spain declares war on Britain.
 20 June – American Revolutionary War: Battle of Stono Ferry.
 6 July – American Revolutionary War: Battle of Grenada fought between British and French navies.
 24 June – American Revolutionary War: start of the Great Siege of Gibraltar (fourteenth and last military siege). This was an action by French and Spanish forces to wrest control of Gibraltar from the established British Garrison. The garrison, led by George Augustus Eliott, later 1st Baron Heathfield of Gibraltar, survives all attacks and a blockade of supplies. 
 15 July – American Revolutionary War: American forces led by General Anthony Wayne capture Stony Point, New York from British troops in the Battle of Stony Point.
 22 July
 American Revolutionary War: Goshen Militia destroyed by Joseph Brant's forces at the Battle of Minisink.
 Armada of 1779: French and Spanish ships rendezvous.
 24 July – American Revolutionary War: the Penobscot Expedition ends in defeat for the Americans.
 14 to 18 August; 31 August to 3 September – Armada of 1779 in the English Channel, but no fleet action with the Royal Navy takes place.
 September – American Revolutionary War: Spain captures Saint Vincent and Grenada from the British.
 7 September – American Revolutionary War: Capture of Fort Bute by Spanish troops.
 20 to 21 September – American Revolutionary War: at the Battle of Baton Rouge Spanish forces defeat the British.
 23 September – American Revolutionary War: Battle of Flamborough Head off the Yorkshire coast: The American ship Bonhomme Richard, commanded by John Paul Jones, engages . The Bonhomme Richard sinks, but the Americans capture the Serapis and other vessels.
 18 October – American Revolutionary War: The Americans abandon the Siege of Savannah.
 October
 First performance of Richard Brinsley Sheridan's play The Critic at the Drury Lane Theatre in London.
 The Bible Society, predecessor of the Naval, Military and Air Force Bible Society, formed in London.
 22 December – American Revolutionary War: Capture of Savannah – British forces under Archibald Campbell take the city of Savannah, Georgia.
 31 December – Affair of Fielding and Bylandt, a brief naval engagement with the Dutch off the Isle of Wight.

Undated
 Parliament passes the Penitentiary Act permitting the creation of state prisons for the first time.
 Industrial Revolution
 Spinning Mule invented by Samuel Crompton.
 The Iron Bridge is erected across the River Severn in Shropshire; the first all cast-iron bridge ever constructed.
 South façade of Stowe House, Buckinghamshire, completed in the neoclassical style based on a design by Robert Adam.
 Robert Adam completes his remodelling of Kenwood House on Hampstead Heath.
 First running of The Oaks horse race.

Publications
 Olney Hymns by John Newton and William Cowper containing the first printed version of Amazing Grace.
 Dialogues concerning Natural Religion by David Hume (posthumous and anonymous).

Births
 1 January – Edward Stanley, Bishop of Norwich (died 1849)
 18 January – Peter Mark Roget, lexicographer (died 1869)
 19 January – Jonathan Backhouse, banker and Quaker minister (died 1842)
 20 February – Augustus Wall Callcott, landscape painter (died 1844)
 24 February – Robert Gifford, 1st Baron Gifford, lawyer, judge and politician (died 1826)
 14 March – William Ormsby-Gore, politician (died 1860)
 15 March – William Lamb, 2nd Viscount Melbourne, Prime Minister of the United Kingdom (died 1848)
 2 May – John Galt, novelist (died 1839)
 13 July – William Hedley, inventor and locomotive engineer (died 1843)
 31 December – Horace Smith, author (died 1849)

Deaths
 20 January – David Garrick, actor (born 1717)
 22 January – Jeremiah Dixon, surveyor and astronomer (born 1733)
 4 February – John Hamilton Mortimer, painter (born 1740)
 7 February – William Boyce, composer (born 1711)
 14 February – James Cook, naval captain and explorer (born 1728)
 1 May - Sarah Clayton, industrialist (born 1712)
 7 June – William Warburton, critic and Bishop of Gloucester (born 1698)
 12 September – Richard Grenville-Temple, 2nd Earl Temple, politician (born 1711)
 8 December – Nathan Alcock, physician (born 1707)
 11 December – Bridget Bevan, philanthropist (born 1698)
 23 December – Augustus Hervey, 3rd Earl of Bristol, admiral and politician (born 1724)
 date unknown
 John Dalrymple, Scottish political writer (born 1734)
 Jane Gomeldon, née Middleton, feminist writer, poet and adventurer (born c. 1720)

References

 
Years in Great Britain